Duminda Wijesekera is an American Computer Scientist of Sri Lankan descent. He is a professor in the Department of Computer Science at George Mason University and acting chair of Cyber Security Engineering Department. He is also a visiting research scientist at the National Institute of Standards and Technology (NIST). He has a PhD in Computer Science from the University of Minnesota (1997) and another PhD in Mathematical Logic from Cornell University (1990). He has a Bachelors in Mathematics from University of Colombo. He also holds a courtesy appointments at the Computer Science Department at the Naval Postgraduate School, NIST. He has published more than 100 research papers in the area of cybersecurity. He was also part of the team that investigated Metro Blue Line derailment in Washington DC.

Wijesekera also leads the Laboratory of Radio and RADAR Engineering (RARE) which is a collaboration between academia, industry and government. In 2007, he was named a Fellow of the Potomac Institute for Policy Studies. He is also considered to be an expert in money laundering and has worked on linking organ trafficking to terrorist networks.

Publications 
 Michael, James Bret, Doron Drusinsky, and Duminda Wijesekera. "Formal Methods in Cyberphysical Systems." Computer 54, no. 09 (2021): 25-29.
 Wang, Lingyu, Duminda Wijesekera, and Sushil Jajodia. "A logic-based framework for attribute based access control." In Proceedings of the 2004 ACM workshop on Formal methods in security engineering, pp. 45-55. 2004.
 Ammann, Paul, Duminda Wijesekera, and Saket Kaushik. "Scalable, graph-based network vulnerability analysis." In Proceedings of the 9th ACM Conference on Computer and Communications Security, pp. 217-224. 2002.
 Lingyu Wang, Sushil Jajodia and Duminda Wijesekera, Preserving Privacy for OnLine Analytical processing, Springer-Verlag, 2006.

References

External links 

1957 births
Living people